A by-election was held for the New South Wales Legislative Assembly electorate of Goldfields West on 15 February 1869 because of the resignation of George Thornton to visit England.

Dates

Result

The by-election was caused by the resignation of George Thornton.

See also
Electoral results for the district of Goldfields West
List of New South Wales state by-elections

References

1869 elections in Australia
New South Wales state by-elections
1860s in New South Wales